Sylvia Gomes (born 1979) is a beauty queen from Bridgeport, Connecticut, who has competed in the Miss America pageant. Gomes worked as a reporter for ABC40, an ABC affiliate in Springfield, Massachusetts, during 2003 and 2004.

Biography

Pageants
Gomes is a native of Bridgeport who now resides in Glastonbury, Connecticut. She was crowned Miss Connecticut 1999 on her first attempt at the crown on May 22, 1999, also winning the swimsuit, interview and talent awards. Her issue of concern as Miss Connecticut 1999 was "Peer Mentoring" and her talent was piano. She became a spokesperson for the National Mentoring Partnership, making over 200 appearances for that organization. 

Gomes represented Connecticut at the Miss America 2000 pageant, placing in the top ten and becoming the first semi-finalist from her state in twenty years.  The eventual winner was Heather French of Kentucky.

After passing on her title, Gomes competed twice for the Miss Connecticut USA title, placing 2nd runner-up in 2001 and 1st runner-up in 2002.

Education and Employment
During her year as Miss Connecticut, Sylvia continued her studies at the College of the Holy Cross, graduating Cum Laude in 2001 with a Bachelors in Art History. While at Holy Cross she became a member of the Alpha Sigma Nu Honor Society, the highest honor awarded on a Jesuit campus. She then landed the Dennis Kauff Memorial Fellowship, a full fellowship to study broadcast journalism at Boston University. She graduated in 2003 with a Master of Science in journalism.

Gomes is the recipient of the Boston University Award for Excellence in News Reporting and Producing, and won the Barnum oratorical contest first prize. She served the City of Bridgeport as a member of the ethics commission during 2001 and 2002.

Gomes married Daniel Duarte in 2003 and is now known as Sylvia Duarte. She is a stay-at-home mother of 7 and now resides in Glastonbury, CT.

External links
https://web.archive.org/web/20080423232259/http://www.miss-ct.org/former_miss_ct.php
http://bridgeport.ct.schoolwebpages.com/education/components/scrapbook/default.php?sectiondetailid=5218
http://www.wtnh.com/Global/story.asp?S=94746

Miss America 2000 delegates
Living people
1979 births
People from Bridgeport, Connecticut
College of the Holy Cross alumni
Boston University College of Communication alumni